Santiago Rojas Arroyo is the 4th and current Minister of Commerce, Industry and Tourism of Colombia, serving in the administration of President Juan Manuel Santos Calderón. Before his appointment, Rojas, a lawyer from the Pontifical Xavierian University, served as President of the Bank of Foreign Trade of Colombia, Bancóldex, and had previously served as Deputy Minister of Foreign Trade, as Director of the Directorate of National Taxes and Customs of Colombia (DIAN), and as Director of the Foreign Trade Institute of Colombia (Incomex).

References

Date of birth missing (living people)
Living people
Place of birth missing (living people)
Pontifical Xavierian University alumni
Academic staff of the Pontifical Xavierian University
20th-century Colombian lawyers
Ministers of Commerce, Industry and Tourism of Colombia
Year of birth missing (living people)